Year 926 (CMXXVI) was a common year starting on Sunday (link will display the full calendar) of the Julian calendar.

Events 
 By place 

 Europe 
 Spring – The Italian nobles turn against King Rudolph II of Burgundy and request that Hugh of Provence, the effective ruler of Lower Burgundy, be elected as king of Italy. Rudolph's father-in-law Duke Burchard II of Swabia is ambushed and killed near Novara, by the henchmen of Archbishop Lambert of Milan. Rudolph, disillusioned by the news, returns to Burgundy to protect himself. Hugh has himself crowned King of Italy. and appoints Giselbert I as count palatine of Bergamo (Northern Italy).
 Battle of the Bosnian Highlands: Bulgarian forces under Duke Alogobotur are ambushed and defeated by a Croatian army of King Tomislav, in the mountainous area of Eastern Bosnia. Tsar Simeon I meets his first defeat against Croatia, but overruns the Western Balkans several times.
 The Hungarians besiege Augsburg in Bavaria, then conquer the monastery of St. Gallen (modern Switzerland). After an unsuccessful battle with the locals, they burn the suburbs of Konstanz, then they cross westwards and defeat a Frankish army led by Duke Liutfred of Alsace.

 Britain 
 King Æthelstan of Wessex and Mercia annexes Northumbria, and forces Wales and Strathclyde to accept his sovereignty along with the Picts and the Scots (approximate date).

 Asia 
 May 15 – Emperor Zhuang Zong is killed during an officer's rebellion led by Guo Congqian at the old Tang capital of Luoyang. He is succeeded by his adoptive brother Li Siyuan (Ming Zong) as ruler of Later Tang. Li sends Yao Kun, as an emissary, to create a friendly relationship with the Khitan Empire.
 September 6 – Emperor Taizu dies after a 10-year reign. He is succeeded by his second son Tai Zong (Yaogu) as ruler of the Chinese Liao Dynasty. Taizu's eldest son Yelü Bei (designated heir apparent) becomes ruler of the Dongdan Kingdom (former Balhae), a puppet state of the Khitan Empire.

 By topic 

 Religion 
 Pope John X allies himself with Hugh of Provence provoking the ire of Marozia, daughter of the Roman consul Theophylact I, who is married to Hugh's rival Guy of Tuscany.

Births 
 July 14 – Murakami, emperor of Japan (d. 967)
 Gao Huaide, Chinese general (approximate date)
 Liu Jun, emperor of Northern Han (d. 968)
 Ordoño III, king of León (approximate date)
 Ordoño IV, king of León (approximate date)
 Phạm Thị Trân, Vietnamese opera singer and Mandarin (d. 976)

Deaths 
 January 8 – Athelm, archbishop of Canterbury
 March 9 – Zhu Youqian, Chinese warlord
 April 29 – Burchard II, duke of Swabia
 May 15 – Zhuang Zong, emperor of Later Tang (b. 885)
 May 26 – Yuan Xingqin, Chinese general
 May 28 
 Kong Qian, official of Later Tang
 Li Jiji, prince of Later Tang
 September 6 – Abaoji (Taizu), emperor of the Khitan Empire
 December 12, William II, duke of Aquitaine
 Abdallah ibn Muhammad al-Khaqani, Abbasid vizier (or 927)
 Alogobotur, Bulgarian nobleman (approximate date)
 Ero Fernández, Galician magnate (approximate date)
 Guo Chongtao, general of Later Tang
 Jin Feishan, empress of Former Shu
 Kang Yanxiao, Chinese general
 Liu, empress and wife of Zhuang Zong
 Pelagius of Córdoba, Christian martyr
 Wang Zongyan, emperor of Former Shu (b. 899)
 Wiborada, Swabian anchoress and martyr
 Xu, empress dowager of Former Shu
 Zhang Quanyi, Chinese warlord (b. 852)

References